The GE PowerHaul is a class of mainline diesel-electric locomotives designed by General Electric. Thirty locomotives were ordered by Freightliner in 2007; the first locomotive was completed in July 2009 at GE's Erie, Pennsylvania, plant.

The Turkish state owned rolling stock manufacturer Tülomsaş has a manufacturing agreement with GE to produce PowerHaul locomotives for European, African and Middle-Eastern markets. The Tülomsaş plant produced its first PowerHaul locomotive in February 2011. In November 2011 Australian engineering firm UGL Rail announced it was to develop a narrow gauge version of the class in association with GE.

Three main subclasses exist: PH37ACmi for UK railways, PH37ACi a version for mainland Europe and elsewhere built to UIC 505-1 vehicle gauge, and PH37ACmai a version for  gauge lines.

Versions of the locomotive include the Class 70 used by Freightliner (UK), the DE36000 of the Turkish State Railways and the Korail Class 7600 (South Korea).

History and design

The PowerHaul Class are a 6 axle Co-Co design for heavy mainline freight operations - the design originated in a collaboration between Freightliner who required a more powerful freight locomotive, and General Electric who needed a launch customer for its entry into the European rolling stock market. The locomotives are the first GE locomotives manufactured for the European market since the Blue Tiger locomotive built in collaboration with AdTranz.

To fit within European and UK mass and loading gauge restrictions GE used a relatively high revving engine (1500rpm), giving a 20% increase in power-weight ratio. The engine uses the same design of transmission system as used in GE's North American AC drive locomotives: an AC alternator, with AC output rectified to an intermediate DC line, with separate inverters and inverter control for each traction motor, auxiliary power is also supplied by the DC link, using electronic inverter based load control. The PM37ACmi design uses a General Electric GTA series alternator, and 5GEB30 axle hung traction motors.

The cab includes heating, air conditioning, and acoustic insulation; the driving controls are 'dial-less' - information is displayed using electronic panel displays. The cab design includes consideration for GSM-R and European Rail Traffic Management System. One innovative feature of the design was the use of electrical power generated when using dynamic braking to supply auxiliary power - resulting in increase in overall efficiency.

Freightliner placed an order for 30 units (originally designated JS37ACi) in November 2007. The first two locomotives manufactured were for Freightliner in the United Kingdom, construction began in May 2009 in Erie, with much of the UK compatibility testing taking place in the US before shipping to the UK. Two locomotives were delivered to the UK in October 2009, and received permission for service use by December 2009.

In December 2008 GE Transportation reached a manufacturing agreement with Tülomsas for the production of future PowerHaul locomotives for Eurasian, and African markets; the initial contract was reported to be for production of 50 units, 30 for GE and 20 for TCDD. In February 2011 Tülomsas completed the assembly of its first PowerHaul from a kit manufactured at GE's Erie plant; the locomotive, built to a UK loading gauge was shipped to the United Kingdom in October 2012.

In April 2012 GE announced that it was to use a PowerHaul locomotive to test its "Tempo" European Rail Traffic Management System system (Level 1 & 2). The locomotive is to be a Tülomsas built unit operated by an unnamed open access operator in Belgium, Netherlands, France, Germany and Switzerland, with operations starting 2013. In September 2012 GE announced that freight operator Heavy Haul Power International (HHPI) would be the recipient of two to six locomotives, which would be used to obtain homologation certification.

Engine
PowerHaul locomotives use a PowerHaul P616 diesel engine; based on the Jenbacher J616 gas engine. The 16 cylinder 4 stroke engine uses the Miller cycle, which GE claims increases fuel efficiency over conventional 4 stroke engines, as well as reducing emissions.

General Electric claims that the engine is more fuel efficient than contemporary competitors, consuming 192g per kilowatt hour at full power output. EU IIIb emission standards are said to be achievable using exhaust gas recirculation and exhaust gas after-treatment by diesel oxidation catalyst.

Sub-types

PH37ACmi

The subtype PH37ACmi was originally built for Freightliner with the TOPS designation given Class 70. The locomotives have a hood unit design, with two cabs.

PH37ACi
A subtype PH37Aci has been designed to be built to fit within the UIC 505-1 vehicle gauge. Unlike the original version built for the UK loading gauge the design has a full width body. The versions have axleload class L620 and L621 as defined by European Standard EN 15528 (2008).

The locomotives retain a twin cab design. The European version is expected to be re-designed to meet 'European Driver Desk' recommendations, and UIC 612 standards, with a central driving position. The L620 version is expected to have a redesigned bogie.

Kits for the new design were expected to be shipped to Tülomsaş (Turkey) in early 2012. A Tulomsas assembled locomotive in Heavy Haul International branding was exhibited at Innotrans trade fair in September 2012.

European freight operator Heavy Haul Power International took a delivery of pilot production 9 Powerhaul locomotives assembled at Tulomsas. They were stored in Cottbus, Germany for several years as their buyer had no use for them.
In 2020 stored PH37ACai locomotives were returned to Turkey for conversion from 1435 mm gauge to 1524 mm gauge for operations in Finland. They were also equipped with Finnish JKV train protection system and Russian standard SA3 couplers. Locomotives were delivered for Estonian operator Operail in 2020 for traffic in Finland.   Finnish locomotive registry designation for PH37ACai is Dr20 (D = diesel, r = raskas (heavy), type 20). Units have been used for goods traffic from Russia to Finland.

PH37ACmai

In November 2011 GE and UGL Rail announced that it would build two prototype UGL Rail PH37ACmai  gauge PowerHaul locomotives. It is intended for use on the narrow gauge networks in Queensland and Western Australia. GE is to supply the power and traction package, with UGL constructing the locomotive frame, some of the work is to be subcontracted to India. The first of three prototypes was nearing completion at its Broadmeadow factory in January 2014. They were sold to Pacific National in 2016.

Production and operators

See also
EMD Class 66
Stadler Euro
Voith Maxima

Notes

References

Sources

External links

, corporate video

 
Co-Co locomotives